George William Crump (September 26, 1786 – October 1, 1848) was a member of the United States House of Representatives in the 19th United States Congress and the U.S. Ambassador to Chile.

Biography
Crump was born in Powhatan County, Virginia. Crump attended then Washington College (now Washington and Lee University) from sometime around 1800 to 1804. According to legend, in August heading into his senior year, Crump was arrested by the authorities of Lexington, Virginia for running naked through the town, the United States' first recorded incident of streaking. Crump was suspended for the first semester of the 1804–05 academic year.

He went on following Washington College to also graduate from Princeton College in 1805, from the College of William & Mary in 1806, and he also studied medicine at the University of Pennsylvania in Philadelphia from 1806–1808.

Crump served in the Virginia House of Delegates. Crump would later serve as member of the Nineteenth Congress of the United States as a Jacksonian Democrat, filling a vacancy caused by the resignation of John Randolph. He served from January 21, 1826, to March 3, 1827.

He was unsuccessful in his bid for reelection in 1826 election to the 20th United States Congress and left public life for a time. He was later appointed by President Andrew Jackson as chief clerk of the Pension Bureau in 1832.

He died on October 1, 1848 in Powhatan County, Virginia and is interred on his home's grounds at "Log Castle" on Swift Creek, Chesterfield County, near Colonial House, Virginia.

References

1786 births
1848 deaths
19th-century American politicians
Ambassadors of the United States to Chile
College of William & Mary alumni
Democratic Party members of the Virginia House of Delegates
Democratic Party members of the United States House of Representatives from Virginia
People from Powhatan County, Virginia
Perelman School of Medicine at the University of Pennsylvania alumni
Princeton University alumni
Virginia Jacksonians
Washington and Lee University alumni